Vietomartyria is a genus of small primitive metallic moths in the family Micropterigidae. They occur in Vietnam and southern China.

Species
There are six species:
Vietomartyria baishanzuna (Yang, 1995)
Vietomartyria expeditionis (Mey, 1997)
Vietomartyria gladiator Hirowatari & Huang, 2010
Vietomartyria jinggangana (Yang, 1980)
Vietomartyria nankunshana Hashimoto & Hirowatari, 2009
Vietomartyria nanlingana Jinbo & Hirowatari, 2009

References

Micropterigidae
Moth genera